Xenolechia ontariensis is a moth of the family Gelechiidae. It is found in North America, where it has been recorded from Manitoba to Texas, as well as Arizona and possibly California.

The wingspan is about 12 mm. Adults are similar to Xenolechia querciphaga, but the ground colour is whitish-grey and the overlying wing colour is distinctly browner. Adults are on wing from April to July.

References

Moths described in 1933
Xenolechia